Roger Hicks may refer to:
 Roger Hicks (author), author of photography and cook books
 Roger Hicks (rock musician), Australian rock musician